Heads Will Roll is a fantasy podcast produced by Audible and Broadway Video and starring Kate McKinnon and her sister Emily Lynne.

Background 
The show is a 10 episode scripted comedy and fantasy podcast that debuted on May 2, 2019. The show was produced by Audible and Broadway Video. Most of the cast is made up of Saturday Night Live alumni. The show is "halfway between an audiobook and a podcast". The show stars Kate McKinnon and her sister Emily Lynne. The cast includes Peter Dinklage. The show also features songs performed by Audra McDonald. AudioFile Magazine speculated whether the show might have a sequel. The role of the evil queen was inspired by one of Vanessa Redgrave's roles.

Cast and characters 

 Aidy Bryant
 Alex Moffat
 Andrea Martin
 Antoni Porowski
 Audra McDonald
 Bob the Drag Queen
 Bobby Berk
 Carol Kane
 Chris Redd
 Emily Lynne as JoJo
 Esther Perel
 Heidi Gardner
 Jonathan Van Ness
 Karamo Brown
 Kate McKinnon as Queen Mortuana
 Meryl Streep
 Peter Dinklage
 Steve Higgins
 Tan France
 Tim Gunn

References

External links 

Audio podcasts
2019 podcast debuts
2019 podcast endings
Fantasy podcasts
Comedy and humor podcasts
Scripted podcasts
American podcasts